

The Chao Mae Tuptim shrine (also known as Penis Shrine) is a phallic shrine in Bangkok, Thailand, located behind the Mövenpick BDMS Wellness Resort Bangkok near the bank of the Khlong Saen Saep. The shrine was created in the first quarter of the 20th century by Thai businessman Nai Lert (1872-1945), who found a spirit house floating in the klong and placed it on the bank of his property. In Thailand, the phallus is considered to be a symbol of good luck and also a representative of fertility. The shrine is one of the best examples of intentional phallic architecture in the world. The size of the penis statues, which number well over 100, is said to range "[from] the size of a cream doughnut to the size of a canoe"; some are huge, some are humorous and painted pink to closely resemble a human phallus.

The shrine is named after Chao Mae Tuptim, a pre-Buddhist Southeast Asian tree spirit, who is said to bestow blessings on those who worship her at the shrine. The site attracts women from all across Thailand and even other east Asian countries. A plaque reads: "Chao Mae Tuptim has received yet another rather less conventional kind of gift, phallic in shape, both small and large, stylized and highly realistic. Over the years, they have been brought by the thousands."

Women hoping to get pregnant leave offerings at the spirit house, flanking a  penis statue draped in cloth, including candles, jasmine, lotus flowers and Chinese incense sticks.

See also
 Haesindang Park

References

Bibliography

Buildings and structures in Bangkok
Thai culture
Phallic symbols
Fertility deities
Phallic monuments